Time Is the Enemy is a live album by bassist Jonas Hellborg, released on 14 October 1997 through Bardo Records; a remastered edition was reissued on 30 March 2004. It features guitarist Shawn Lane and drummer Jeff Sipe (credited as Apt. Q-258) as collaborators, both of whom joined Hellborg on his previous album Temporal Analogues of Paradise (1996).

Critical reception

C. Michael Bailey at All About Jazz gave Time Is the Enemy a positive review, calling it "virtuosic" and "totally improvised and totally honest", whilst saying that the trio of Hellborg, Lane and Sipe were "making fusion fun and interesting again." Michael G. Nastos at AllMusic gave the album four stars out of five, also remarking that the trio was "pumping some stark vitality" into jazz fusion.

Track listing

Personnel

Jonas Hellborg – bass, production
Shawn Lane – guitar
Jeff Sipe – drums
Scud Noonan – mixing

References

External links
CD review: "Time Is the Enemy" at trageser.com

Jonas Hellborg albums
Shawn Lane albums
1997 live albums